Chrey may refer to several places in Cambodia:

Battambang Province

Chrey, Moung Ruessei 
Chrey, Thma Koul

Prey Veng Province
Chrey, Prey Veng